Corwin is the name of at least two sites in the U.S. state of Indiana:

Corwin, Henry County, Indiana (extinct)
Corwin, Tippecanoe County, Indiana (extinct)